Marvin Phillips (born December 28, 1983) is an American professional basketball player who currently plays for the KW Titans of the National Basketball League of Canada. He most notably won the NBL Canada Finals Most Valuable Player Award in 2013, after leading the London Lightning to a National Basketball League of Canada championship that season. He was also named the league's All-Star Game MVP that same year, and Newcomer of the Year. Phillips has previously appeared in the NBA Development League, with teams like the Fort Wayne Mad Ants and Iowa Energy. He joined the KW Titans in 2019.

Phillips played for the Oklahoma City Cavalry of the Continental Basketball Association (CBA) during the 2007–08 season. He was named the CBA Defensive Player of the Year and earned All-CBA Second Team honors.

References

External links 
Marvin Phillips on ShamSports.com
Marvin Phillips on Eurobasket.com

1983 births
Living people
American expatriate basketball people in Canada
American expatriate basketball people in Colombia
American expatriate basketball people in France
American expatriate basketball people in Mexico
American men's basketball players
Argentino de Junín basketball players
Basketball players from North Carolina
Claflin University alumni
College men's basketball players in the United States
Dodge City Conquistadors basketball players
Erie BayHawks (2008–2017) players
Étoile Charleville-Mézières players
Fort Wayne Mad Ants players
Fuerza Regia de Monterrey players
Iowa Energy players
KW Titans players
London Lightning players
People from Jacksonville, North Carolina
Power forwards (basketball)